Spondyliosoma is a genus of fish belonging to the family Sparidae.

The genus has almost cosmopolitan distribution.

Species:
 Spondyliosoma emarginatum Valenciennes, 1830 
 Spondyliosoma cantharus (Linnaeus, 1758)

References

Sparidae
Ray-finned fish genera